Vladislav Yegin (13 April 1989  11 May 2021) was a Russian ice hockey defenceman.  Most recently prior to his death, he was playing with Avtomobilist Yekaterinburg of the Kontinental Hockey League (KHL).

Life and career
He made his Kontinental Hockey League debut playing with Avtomobilist Yekaterinburg during the 2013–14 KHL season.

Yegin died from complications of COVID-19 on 11 May 2021, at the age of 32.

References

External links 

 

1989 births
2021 deaths
Avtomobilist Yekaterinburg players
HC Spartak Moscow players
Place of death missing
Russian ice hockey defencemen
Ice hockey people from Moscow
Deaths from the COVID-19 pandemic in Russia